SK Liet was a football club from Zemun (nowadays Serbia). Local Germans from Zemun and other parts of Syrmia gathered around this club.

Name 
Its name literally means  Sports Club "Liet".

History 
The squad competed in the football championship of Independent State of Croatia. After the end of Second World War, that circumstance was used to ban the work of this football club and disband it, as it was the case with other clubs that competed in the championship of Independent State of Croatia.

In the unfinished Croatian championship 1944, in the group stage (City of Zemun championship), Liet took the third place in the group, behind Dunav and Građanski and in front of Hajduk, and ended the competition.

Sources 
 Croatia Domestic Football Full Tables

Football clubs in Yugoslavia
Defunct football clubs in Serbia
German diaspora in Europe
Syrmia